is a Fukui Railway Fukubu Line station located in the city of Fukui, Fukui, Japan.

Lines

Station layout
The station consists of two ground-level opposed side platforms connected by a level crossing. There is no station building, but rather two raised platforms in the median of Phoenix-dōri (Prefectural Route 30) from which customers board and disembark.

Adjacent stations

History
On March 27, 2016 Kidayotsusuji Station was renamed to Shokokaigisho-mae Station

Surrounding area
 The area is mostly residential with some stores and commercial buildings. To the south lies Shin-Kida intersection.
 Other points of interest include:
 Fukui Prefectural Health & Welfare Center
 Fukui Chamber of Commerce and Industry
 Seiren Co., Ltd. Fukui headquarters
 Fukui Nishi-Kida Post Office
 Fukui Kasuga Post Office
 Fujishima Shrine

See also
 List of railway stations in Japan

References

External links
  

Railway stations in Fukui Prefecture
Railway stations in Japan opened in 1933
Fukui Railway Fukubu Line
Fukui (city)